A Box of Rain is a 1990 book by Grateful Dead lyricist Robert Hunter, compiling his complete songbook, in and out of the Dead, from 1965 until 1990. A more-recent paperback edition has also been published, which includes lyrics up until 1993; the original edition was hardbound. The 1993 publication also includes a different introduction by the author.

The book's title comes from "Box of Rain", a song recorded and made famous on the Dead's 1970 studio classic, American Beauty.

Sources 
 
 Robert Hunter, A Box of Rain, Penguin (Non-Classics); (1993)  

1990 books
Grateful Dead